Clare Cavendish was a British writer of romance novels from 1964 to 1982.

She was the tenth elected Chairman (1979–1981) of the Romantic Novelists' Association.

Bibliography

Single novels
Doctor in Trouble (1964)
Doctor's Choice (1965)
Hospital in Danger (1966)
The Doctor Next Door (1967)
Nurse in Hiding (1968)
Ward Nine at St. Jude's (1969)
Mind of a Doctor (1969)
Doctor's Quest (1970)
Hospital Summer (1971)
Youngest Sister (1972)
Nurse at the Crossroads (1974)
A Doctor Must Dream (1974)
Ship's Nurse (1975)
Sister at Rivermead (1976)
Doctor in Charge (1977)
Staff Nurse at Nordale (1978)
Doctor at Greyfriars (1979)
Doctor's Family (1980)
Nurse in the Highlands (1981)
Village Nurse (1982)

Plays
 Christmas Visitor (1966)

References and sources

                   

British romantic fiction writers
Year of birth missing (living people)
Possibly living people
Place of birth missing (living people)